Halorella is an extinct genus of brachiopods belonging to the family Halorellidae.

Fossil record
These lamp shells lived in the Triassic (from Carnian to Rhaetian age). Fossils of species within this genus can be found in Austria, Canada, China, Hungary, Indonesia, New Zealand, Russia, Slovakia, Tajikistan, Turkey and United States.

Species
Species within this genus include:
 Halorella amphitoma Bronn 1832
 Halorella flabella Xu 1978
 Halorella geniculata Xu 1978
 Halorella jianchuanensis Jin and Fang 1977

External links
 Mindat.org
 Peckmann, J., Kiel, Steffen, Sandy, Michael, Taylor, David, Goedert, James Mass Occurrences of the Brachiopod Halorella in Late Triassic Methane-Seep Deposits, Eastern Oregon Journal of Geology
 Sandy, Michael, Forel, Marie-Béatrice, Gradinaru, Eugen, Peckmann, J, Gradinaru, M Late Triassic brachiopod Halorella assemblages from paleokarst cavities near Vașcău, Apuseni Mountains, Romania

References 

Brachiopods